Caloptilia crasiphila is a moth of the family Gracillariidae. It is known from the Northern Territory, Australia.

References

crasiphila
Moths of Australia
Moths described in 1912